Paranda Fort is situated in Paranda, a small town in the Osmanabad district in the state of Maharashtra, India. It is protected monument by the Archaeological Survey Of India. The fort may have been constructed in the 15th century by Mahmud Gawan or by Murtaza Nizam Shah II in the early 1600s. Paranda has great historical value and finde mention in Honnati inscription of Baka 1045] (A.D. 1924) and also later a few of the Kalyan Chalukyan an copper plates. As well as in Yadava epigraphs, as Pallyanda Pratyandaka. The fort is attraction in this Paranda town and is known to have been built by Mahmud Gavan, the Prime Ministar of Muhammad Shah Bahmani 2.

Paranda fort is a solid construction of mediaeval age. It's rampart walls being fortified by 26 strong rounded bastions, one of which tank the main entrance on the northern side. Further it has a protective maat or khandak around connected with the fort by ance wooden draw bridge Some of the bastions in strategic places are mounted with huge cannons which can aver be seen today. These were mostly cast by Dutch craftsmen and one of them bears the name Husain Arabs, an Arab engineer in the service of the Bijapur. In one of the store rooms there are a few more cannons of which one is quite huge and an which is inscribed "Sarkar Nabab Mir Nizam All Khan Nearly 300 cannon bolls are found stored in yut another rooms.

Paranda fort is now a state protected monument under the Maharashtra Ancient Monuments and Archaeological Sites & Remains Act. 1960.

References 

Buildings and structures of the Maratha Empire
Former capital cities in India
Forts in Maharashtra
Osmanabad district